Udalbani is a village in Jamtara district of Jharkhand state of India. According to the 2011 Census of India, 1910 people lived here.

See also 
 Jamtara district

References 

Villages in Jamtara district